John Edgar Reyburn (February 7, 1845 – January 4, 1914) was an American politician from Ohio who served as a Republican member of the U.S. House of Representatives for Pennsylvania's 4th congressional district from 1890 to 1897, Pennsylvania's 2nd congressional district from 1906 to 1907 and Mayor of Philadelphia.

Early life and education
Reyburn (father of William S. Reyburn) was born in New Carlisle, Ohio, the son of William and Lydia Reeder Crain Reyburn. He was instructed by a private tutor and attended Saunders Institute in West Philadelphia, Pennsylvania. He studied law, was admitted to the bar in 1870, and commenced practice in Philadelphia. He married Margaretta Eleanor Crozier, and they had three children, William Stuart, Robert Crozier, and Eleanor Crozier.

Career
Reyburn was a member of the Pennsylvania House of Representatives in 1871 and again in 1874 through 1876.  He was a member of the Pennsylvania State Senate from 1876 through 1892 and served as president pro tempore during the session of 1883.

Elected to Congress as a Republican to fill the vacancy left by the death of William D. Kelley, Reyburn was reelected three times and served from February 18, 1890, to March 3, 1897, until he was an unsuccessful candidate for renomination in 1896.  He was again elected to Congress to fill the vacancy left by the death of Robert Adams, Jr. and was reelected in 1906 to the 60th United States Congress, serving from November 6, 1906, to March 31, 1907, when he resigned to serve as Mayor of Philadelphia.  Elected in the 1907 Philadelphia mayoral election, he served as mayor from April 1, 1907, to December 4, 1911, and engaged in manufacturing in Philadelphia, but retained a residence in Washington, D.C.

Death
Reyburn died on January 4, 1914, in his Washington, D.C. residence and is interred in Laurel Hill Cemetery in Philadelphia, Pennsylvania.

References

External links

The Political Graveyard
 

1845 births
1914 deaths
Mayors of Philadelphia
Republican Party Pennsylvania state senators
Republican Party members of the Pennsylvania House of Representatives
Politicians from Philadelphia
People from New Carlisle, Ohio
Republican Party members of the United States House of Representatives from Pennsylvania
Burials at Laurel Hill Cemetery (Philadelphia)
19th-century American politicians